Phyllis Kathleen Roberts née Aspden (born 11 June 1916) was a British sculptor and painter, notably of portraits

Roberts was born in London and studied at the Hornsey School of Art. Throughout her career she exhibited at the Royal Academy in London, at several notable commercial galleries in Britain and in France at the Paris Salon. At the Salon, she won a silver medal in 1959 and a gold medal in 1964. She was an elected member of the Royal Institute of Oil Painters and also showed works with the Contemporary Portrait Society and the Royal Society of Portrait Painters. For a time she lived at Aldwick in Sussex.

The Royal Institute of Oil Painters award an annual Phyllis Roberts Award in memory of the artist. It is given to a promising artist under 30.

Further reading
 Dictionary of British Artists Working 1900–1950 by Grant M. Waters, 1975, published by Eastbourne Fine Art

References

1916 births
Year of death missing
20th-century English painters
20th-century English women artists
Alumni of Middlesex University
Artists from London
English women painters
English women sculptors